Morten Bergeton Iversen (born 19 November 1974), better known by his stage name Teloch, is a Norwegian black metal musician known for being a live guitarist for Gorgoroth, God Seed and 1349. He is currently the guitarist for Mayhem.

Career 
Teloch's musical career began in the early 1990s in a punk band called Dødsdømt and a thrash/death metal band called Legions from Horten (Vestfold). He founded Nidingr in 1996. That same year they recorded their first demo show 1996 and, in 1999, the second demo.

In 2004, he joined the band Orcustus.

In 2005 Nidingr published their first studio album, Sorrow Infinite and Darkness.

In 2006, he joined the band 1349 as a live guitarist.

The following year he left 1349 and was contracted as guitarist by the band Gorgoroth, which at that moment was divided into two groups. Facing the impossibility of King ov Hell and Gaahl to work under the name of Gorgoroth, they were forced to change the name to God Seed (in March 2009), still counting on the help of Teloch as session musician.

In August 2009, vocalist Gaahl announced his retirement from black metal, putting an end to the band's short existence.

Nidingr released their second album, Wolf-Father, in 2010. Iversen was a guest guitarist on the French breakcore project Igorrr and the album Hallelujah (2012). The same year Nidingr released their third album, Greatest of Deceivers.

Iversen wrote the music for a 2015 production of the stage play Mor Courage og barna hennar at the Norwegian Theatre.

Iversen has been a member of Mayhem since 2011 and wrote almost the whole album Esoteric Warfare on his own. Nidingr released their fourth album, The High Heat Licks Against Heaven, in 2017.

Discography 
With Orcustus
Wrathrash (EP) (2005)
Orcustus (2009)

With Nidingr
Sorrow Infinite and Darkness (2005)
Wolf-Father (2010)
Greatest of Deceivers (2012)
The High Heat Licks Against Heaven (2017)

With Mayhem
 Esoteric Warfare (2014)
 De Mysteriis Dom Sathanas Alive (2016)
 Daemon (2019)

With Myrkur
 M (2015)

References

1974 births
Living people
Mayhem (band) members
Norwegian black metal musicians